South African National Library and Information Consortium (SANLiC) is a non-profit consortium of member institutions aimed at negotiating the procurement of, and securing access to information resources on behalf of its members.

History 
The Coalition of South African Library Consortia (COSALC), a non-profit organisation, was established in 1999 as a single umbrella organisation to include the various higher education academic library consortia, the National Library of South Africa (NLSA), the Library and Information Association of South Africa (LIASA), and the various research entities. COSALC’s primary strategic focus was at national level, in particular, the establishment of a national site-licensing project.  The South African Site Licensing Initiative (SASLI) commenced work in May 2002. COSALC was registered formally with the South African Registrar of Companies as a Section 21 (not-for-profit) company in 2003 and received start-up funding from the Open Society Institute.

During the transformation of South Africa’s higher education landscape in the early years of the 21st century, COSALC/SASLI played an important role. In accordance with the National plan for higher education, published by the Ministry of Education,  the number of higher education institutions was reduced from 35 to 23 in order to remove the imbalances of the past and to bring about greater efficiencies within the system. COSALC/SASLI negotiated the consolidation of multiple subscriptions to electronic information resources to one subscription per merged institution, arranged access for all the sites within the merged institutions at no additional cost and facilitated new collection development policies. This resulted in considerable savings on subscriptions to electronic databases and journals for academic libraries.

At the 2006 Annual General Meeting it was agreed to change the name of the organisation.  Following a protracted and tedious legal process, the Coalition of South African Library Consortia (COSALC) became the South African National Library and Information Consortium (SANLiC) on 21 June 2011. The decision to change the name was taken in order to reinforce the organisation’s national commitment and to accommodate a more varied membership.  Further change in the shape of a complete restructuring of the membership structure followed when a special resolution was taken at a General Meeting held on 12 October 2011. The membership had previously consisted of the regional consortia; in the new membership structure, the individual institutions became the registered members.

Membership and Governance 
SANLiC is responsible for collective site licensing negotiations on behalf of its members (26 public universities and six research councils) and institutions from other southern African countries who do not qualify for direct membership. Membership of SANLiC is open all South African public higher education institutions, statutory research institutions, and other public entities, subject to SANLiC board approval. Member organisations pay an annual membership fee as well as a service fee for each deal in which they participate. Member voting rights and membership fees are based on a tiered system according to participation. The SANLiC staff report to the Board of Directors, who in turn are elected by the member representatives.

Members

Higher Education Members 
 Cape Peninsula University of Technology
 Central University of Technology
 Durban University of Technology
 Mangosuthu University of Technology
 Nelson Mandela University
 North-West University
 Rhodes University
 Sefako Makgatho Health Sciences University
 Sol Plaatje University
 Stellenbosch University
 Tshwane University of Technology
 University of Cape Town
 University of Fort Hare
 University of the Free State
 University of Johannesburg
 University of KwaZulu-Natal
 University of Limpopo
 University of Mpumalanga
 University of Pretoria
 University of South Africa
 University of Venda
 University of Western Cape
 University of the Witwatersrand
 University of Zululand
 Vaal University of Technology
 Walter Sisulu University

Research Institutions 
 Agricultural Research Council
 Council for Scientific and Industrial Research
 Human Sciences Research Council
 National Library of South Africa
 National Research Foundation
 South African Medical Research Council

Other 
 University of Botswana
 University of Namibia

References

External links 
 

Non-profit organisations based in South Africa
Library associations